Pluchea lanceolata, the rasna or rasana, is a species of flowering plant in the family Asteraceae. It is disjunctly distributed in Africa; Senegal, Chad, and Tanzania, and Asia; Iran, Afghanistan, Pakistan, the western Himalayas, and India. A perennial herb, it is considered a noxious weed by agriculturalists, and is used in Ayurveda and Tibetan traditional medicines.

References

lanceolata
Medicinal plants
Flora of Senegal
Flora of Chad
Flora of Tanzania
Flora of Iran
Flora of Afghanistan
Flora of Pakistan
Flora of West Himalaya
Flora of India (region)
Plants described in 1876